The 2015–16 Prairie View A&M Panthers basketball team represented Prairie View A&M University during the 2015–16 NCAA Division I men's basketball season. The Panthers, led by tenth year head coach Byron Rimm II, played their home games at the William Nicks Building and were members of the Southwestern Athletic Conference. They finished the season 7–24, 7–11 in SWAC play to finish in sixth place. They lost in the quarterfinals of the SWAC tournament to Jackson State.

On January 27, 2016, following a 1–16 start to the season, head coach Byron Rimm II resigned. Assistant coach Byron Smith was named interim coach. On March 14, Prairie View A&M removed the interim coach tag and named Byron Smith head coach.

Roster

Recruits

Schedule 

|-
!colspan=9 style="background:#; color:white;"| Regular season

|-

|-

|-

|-

|-

|-

|-

|-

|-

|-

|-

|-

|-

|-

|-

|-

|-

|-

|-

|-

|-

|-

|-

|-

|-

|-

|-

|-

|-

|-
!colspan=9 style="background:#; color:white;"| SWAC tournament

References 

Prairie View A&M Panthers basketball seasons
Prairie View AandM